Super Ligue may refer to:

 New Caledonia Super Ligue, football league in New Caledonia, France
 Super Ligue (Niger), football league in Niger

See also 

 Super League (disambiguation)